Louise Ball Stutes (born July 30, 1952) is an American politician from Alaska. A Republican, Stutes is a member of the Alaska House of Representatives, representing House District 32 on Kodiak Island since 2015. She had served as Speaker of the Alaska House of Representatives from 2021 to 2023.

Career 
Stutes previously served on the Assembly of the Kodiak Island Borough from 2006 to 2013. As a candidate for the House of Representatives, she was an advocate for the commercial fishing industry and the Alaska Marine Highway.

Stutes defeated primary opponent Carol Austerman, daughter of retiring incumbent Alan Austerman, in August 2014 and went on to beat Jerry McCune of Cordova, the Democratic nominee, in November to win a seat in the legislature.

In 2021, Stutes was elected speaker of the house by a bipartisan, primarily Democratic coalition, succeeding acting speaker and temporary speaker pro tempore Josiah Patkotak, who had succeeded former speaker Bryce Edgmon at the conclusion of the previous session.

Personal life
Stutes has lived in Kodiak since 1980. Her husband, Stormy, is a commercial fisherman. She has four children. She owned the Village Bar on Kodiak Island for 25 years.

References

|-

1952 births
21st-century American politicians
21st-century American women politicians
Living people
People from Kodiak, Alaska
Republican Party members of the Alaska House of Representatives
Speakers of the Alaska House of Representatives
Women legislative speakers
Women state legislators in Alaska